Chabany is an urban-type settlement in Fastiv Raion of Kyiv Oblast (province), located on southern border of Kyiv. It hosts the administration of Chabany settlement hromada, one of the hromadas of Ukraine.  Population: .

Until 18 July 2020, Chabany belonged to Kyiv-Sviatoshyn Raion. The raion was abolished that day as part of the administrative reform of Ukraine, which reduced the number of raions of Kyiv Oblast to seven. The area of Kyiv-Sviatoshyn Raion was split between Bucha, Fastiv, and Obukhiv Raions, with Chabany being transferred to Fastiv Raion.

References

Urban-type settlements in Fastiv Raion
Kyiv metropolitan area
Fastiv Raion